Demolition is the third studio album by alt-country singer-songwriter Ryan Adams, released on September 24, 2002, on Lost Highway. The album comprises tracks from Adams' unreleased studio albums, The Suicide Handbook, The Pinkheart Sessions and 48 Hours, as well as "You Will Always Be The Same" from The Stockholm Sessions. In 2009, Adams stated: "I don’t much care for this record. The rock songs are plodding and the quiet songs belonged to better records [...] to make Gold as a compromise then to have to watch those records get broken up for Demolition was heartbreaking."

Track listing

Personnel
 Ryan Adams – Vocals (all tracks), Guitar (tracks 2,3,4,5,7,9,11,12,13), Electric guitar (tracks 1,6,8,10), Harmonica (tracks 2,4), Bass (tracks 5,13), Piano (tracks 5,8), Synth (track 13), Drum Machine (track 13)
 Mikael Nord Andersson – Dobro (track 3)
 Bucky Baxter – Pedal Steel Guitar (tracks 1,6,8,10), Background vocals (tracks 5,7), Guitar (tracks 5,9)
 Michael Blair – Djembe Heartbeat (track 3)
 Sheldon Gomberg – Bass (tracks 2,4)
 Svante Henryson – Cello (track 3)
 Ethan Johns – Drums (tracks 2,4,12), Background vocals (track 2), Electric guitar (track 2), Ukulele (track 4), Bass (track 12), B3 (track 2)
 John Paul Keith – Guitar (tracks 6,10)
 Greg Leisz – Steel Guitar (tracks 2,4,12), Dobro (track 12)
 Billy Mercer – Bass (tracks 1,6,10)
 Brad Pemberton – Drums (tracks 1,6,8,10)
 David Rawlings – Guitar (track 11)
 Julianna Raye – Background vocals (track 4)
 Brad Rice – Electric guitar (tracks 1,8)
 Chris Stills – Background vocals (track 2), 12-String Acoustic Guitar (track 2), B3 (track 4)
 Gillian Welch – Background vocals (track 11)

Charts

Album

Singles

References

External links
 

Ryan Adams albums
2002 albums
Lost Highway Records albums
Albums produced by Ethan Johns